Jason "Ratboy" Collins (born July 4, 1974, in Santa Cruz, CA) is an aerial surfer who graduated from Santa Cruz High School.  Following the lead of surfers such as Christian Fletcher, Collins dominated aerial surfing in the mid-nineties. Collins is best known for his extensive repertoire of aerial maneuvers, including double grabs, reverses, and 360 breaths of air, many of which he pioneered. Collins is also an accomplished longboarder and is well known for his overall riding style.

He landed a backside 360 air during the Expression Session at the O'Neill Cold Water Classic in 1994 when other competitors were doing top turns and roundhouse cutbacks. By landing that air, Collins defined his persona in the surfing world.  He is a staple at surf competition air shows, has been published on multiple magazine covers and has a line of signature surfboards with the Stretch label.

External links 
 EXPN Interview
 Transworld Surf Bio
 Santa Cruz Sentinel Article 
 Surfline Santa Cruz Clip
 Surfline video search Jason "Ratboy" Collins

1972 births
Living people
American surfers
Sportspeople from Santa Cruz, California
Sportspeople from the San Francisco Bay Area
Santa Cruz High School alumni